Sylvain Cadieux (born 25 September 1974) is a Canadian archer. He competed in the men's individual and team events at the 1992 Summer Olympics.

References

1974 births
Living people
Canadian male archers
Olympic archers of Canada
Archers at the 1992 Summer Olympics
People from Terrebonne, Quebec
Sportspeople from Quebec
20th-century Canadian people